Gong Qinggai (born June 1958) is a former Chinese politician who spent most of his career throughout the southeastern China's Fujian province. As of January 2016 he was under investigation by the Communist Party's anti-corruption agency. He served in various administrative and political roles in Fujian province and over a period of 35 years worked his way up to the position of deputy director of the Taiwan Affairs Office. He served as mayor of Jinjiang, a county-level city under the jurisdiction of Quanzhou, from January 1996 to October 2003, and Communist Party Secretary, the top political position in the city, from May 2002 to June 2005.

He was a member of the 11th National People's Congress and a member of the 18th National Congress of the Chinese Communist Party. 

Gong is fluent in Taiwanese (Hokkien).

Biography
Gong was born in Shishi, Fujian, in June 1958. He graduated from the Open University of Hong Kong.

He joined the Chinese Communist Party in March 1979, and entered the workforce in September 1980. 

He served in various posts in Jinjiang County before serving as vice-mayor of Jinjiang in December 1992. In April 1995 he was promoted to become deputy party chief and mayor of Jijiang, and held that offices until May 2002. Then he was promoted again to become party chief of Jinjiang. He also served as deputy party chief of Quanzhou from March 2005 to January 2007. In January 2007, he was transferred to Nanping, and served as its deputy party chief and vice-mayor. Five months later, he was promoted to the Mayor position. In February 2010, he was transferred to Pingtan Comprehensive Pilot Zone, where he served as secretary of Party Working Committee and director of the Administrative Committee. In October 2013, he was appointed as deputy director of the Taiwan Affairs Office. When he was in office, he made a secret visit to Taiwan.

Downfall
On January 19, 2016, Gong Qinggai came under investigation for "serious legal violations", a brief statement issued by the Central Commission for Discipline Inspection on its website, without elaborating. He was expelled from the Communist Party on April 21, for "violates political discipline, membership in private clubs, plays golf and bribery".

On April 20, 2017, Gong Qinggai was sentenced for 15 years in prison, having been convicted on charges of bribery by the Anyang People's Intermediate Court. Five million yuan of personal assets were seized, and all of his earnings deemed to have come from corrupt sources were confiscated by the national treasury. The total value of bribes recorded by the court was 53.52 million yuan.

References

External links

1958 births
Hokkien people
People from Shishi, Fujian
Alumni of Hong Kong Metropolitan University
Living people
People's Republic of China politicians from Fujian
Chinese Communist Party politicians from Fujian
Expelled members of the Chinese Communist Party
Chinese politicians convicted of corruption
Politicians from Quanzhou